Adriano Goldman is a Brazilian television director and cinematographer born in São Paulo, Brazil. He won "Excellence in Cinematography Award: Dramatic"  during the 2009 Sundance Film Festival for his cinematography in Cary Joji Fukunaga's 2009 film Sin Nombre.

His first short, Is Reinaldo Still Swimming?, won top prize at both the São Paulo Fotoptica Video Festival and the Havana Film Festival (Festival Internacional del Nuevo Cine Latinoamericano) in Havana, Cuba.

Goldman worked in music videos and commercials, and filmed a number of musical concerts, particularly with MTV Brasil, where he directed the inaugural acoustic program "Unplugged". His video of Sepultura's "Orgasmatron," won the International Viewer's Choice Award at the MTV Video Music Awards.

He also won three ABC Trophies for Rede Globo/O2 Filmes hit series City of Men (winning 2002 ABC Trophy for Best Cinematography in a Television Series) as well as for Sons of Carnival (Filhos do Carnaval) directed by Cao Hamburger and for cinematography of Hamburger's The Year My Parents Went on Vacation (O Ano em Que Meus Pais Sairam de Férias). 

For his work on the Netflix series The Crown, he won a Primetime Emmy Award  in the category of Outstanding Cinematography for a Single-Camera Series (One Hour) in the 70th Primetime Creative Arts Emmy Awards.

Filmography
 Andor (2022)
 Burnt (2015)
 Trash (2014)
 August: Osage County (2013)
 Closed Circuit (2013)
 The Company You Keep (2012)
 Xingu (2012)
 360 (2011)
 Jane Eyre (2011)
 Conviction (2010)
 Sin Nombre (2009)
 City of Men (2007)
 The Year My Parents Went on Vacation (2006)
 O Casamento de Romeu e Julieta (2005)

External links
 

Brazilian cinematographers
Brazilian television directors
Living people
Sundance Film Festival award winners
Year of birth missing (living people)